Labutta Township or Latputta Township is one of the two townships in Labutta District in the Ayeyarwady Region of Myanmar. It is located in the delta of the Irrawaddy.

84,454 people from this township were listed as dead or missing as a result of the devastating Cyclone Nargis in 2008. As a result, there was a worldwide effort to rehabilitate the villages and towns of Labutta severely affected by the cyclone.

Communities
, there were 115 village tracts in Labutta Township comprising 684 villages; however the township's boundaries were adjusted on 5 August 2009.

Notes

External links
 "Labutta Google Satellite Map" Maplandia World Gazetteer

Townships of Ayeyarwady Region